Forest W. Hopkins (December 12, 1912 – April 27, 1978) was a Republican member of the Pennsylvania House of Representatives.

References

Republican Party members of the Pennsylvania House of Representatives
1978 deaths
1912 births
20th-century American politicians